Michael Houser (born September 13, 1992) is an American professional ice hockey goaltender who is currently playing with the Rochester Americans in the American Hockey League (AHL) while under contract with the Buffalo Sabres of the National Hockey League (NHL).

Playing career
Following a lone season with the Des Moines Buccaneers of the United States Hockey League (USHL), Houser joined the Ontario Hockey League's (OHL) London Knights for the 2009–10 season. Going (17–4–1) in 25 appearances, he was named to the Canadian Hockey League (CHL) All-Rookie Team and the OHL First All-Rookie Team. The 2011–12 season saw Houser go (46–15–5) in 62 games. He was rewarded with the Jim Rutherford Trophy for OHL goaltender of the year as well as the Red Tilson Trophy for the league's most outstanding player. Houser was also recognized as the CHL Goaltender of the Year. The Knights won the J. Ross Robertson Cup as league champions but were defeated by the host Shawinigan Cataractes in the final of the Memorial Cup.

Undrafted, Houser attended the Florida Panthers' 2012 development camp. On July 11, the Panthers signed him to a three-year, entry-level contract. He spent his first professional season playing for the Cincinnati Cyclones of the East Coast Hockey League (ECHL). Houser moved to the San Antonio Rampage of the American Hockey League (AHL) for the 2013–14 season, going 12–13–1.

The Panthers chose not to tender Houser with a qualifying offer following the 2014–15 season, rendering him an unrestricted free agent. He skated with both the AHL's Ontario Reign and the ECHL's Manchester Monarchs for the 2015–16 season.

Houser attended the Columbus Blue Jackets' 2016 training camp but was not signed. He instead signed with the team's AHL affiliate, the Cleveland Monsters on October 14. Aside from a lone appearance with the Monsters, Houser spent the majority of the season with the Cyclones.

Houser once again attended an NHL training camp the following season, this time for the Arizona Coyotes. He was released on September 18, but spent the season with their affiliates (the AHL's Tucson Roadrunners and ECHL's Fort Wayne Komets).

As the Cyclones goaltender for the 2018–19 season, Houser had a 29–7–5 record in 41 games. He was named ECHL Goaltender of the Year as well as a member of the league's first all-star team.

On September 11, 2020, the Rochester Americans re-signed Houser to a one-year contract. He remained on the Americans' roster as the Cyclones—an affiliate of the Americans—opted out of the 2020–21 season due to the COVID-19 pandemic. On March 19, 2021, the Buffalo Sabres signed Houser to a one-year contract for the remainder of the season. He subsequently spent time on the team's taxi squad. Houser made his NHL debut on May 3, stopping 34 shots in a 4–2 win over the New York Islanders. Speaking about making the NHL and winning his first game, he stated "I've worked my whole life for this, for it to happen. Just to play a game is really special. But to win, winning is always the goal. That's why we play." Houser started a second-straight game against the Islanders the following night, this time making 45 saves in a 4–3 shootout win.

As a free agent following his stint with the Sabres, Houser continued within the organization in agreeing to a one-year contract to remain with the Rochester Americans on August 5, 2021. With the Sabres suffering a spate of goaltender injuries for the second consecutive season, Houser was signed to a one-year, two-way contract in returning to the NHL with Buffalo on January 12, 2022.

On July 15, 2022, Houser was familiarly re-signed to remain within the Sabres organization, agreeing to a one-year AHL contract to continue with the Rochester Americans.

Career statistics

Awards and honors

References

External links 
 

1992 births
Living people
American men's ice hockey goaltenders
Buffalo Sabres players
Cincinnati Cyclones (ECHL) players
Cleveland Monsters players
Des Moines Buccaneers players
Fort Wayne Komets players
Ice hockey players from Ohio
London Knights players
Manchester Monarchs (ECHL) players
Ontario Reign (AHL) players
Rochester Americans players
San Antonio Rampage players
Sportspeople from Youngstown, Ohio
Tucson Roadrunners players
Undrafted National Hockey League players